The fly genus Deuterophlebia is the sole member of the small monogeneric family Deuterophlebiidae or mountain midges. Adults have broad, fan-shaped wings, and males have extremely long antennae which they employ when contesting territories over running water, waiting for females to hatch. Larvae occur in swiftly flowing streams and are easily recognized by their forked antennae and the prolegs on the abdomen.

One classification places this family in its own infraorder Deuterophlebiomorpha, but this has not gained wide acceptance.  A recent phylogeny of the entire order Diptera places them as the sister group to all other flies.

Species 
Catalogue of Life accepts the following species within Deuterophlebia:

 Deuterophlebia bicarinata Courtney, 1994
 Deuterophlebia blepharis Courtney, 1994
 Deuterophlebia brachyrhina Courtney, 1994
 Deuterophlebia coloradensis Pennak, 1945
 Deuterophlebia inyoensis Kennedy, 1960
 Deuterophlebia mirabilis Edwards, 1922
 Deuterophlebia nielsoni Kennedy, 1958
 Deuterophlebia nipponica Kitakami, 1938
 Deuterophlebia oporina Courtney, 1994
 Deuterophlebia personata Courtney, 1990
 Deuterophlebia sajanica Jedlička & Halgoš, 1981
 Deuterophlebia shasta Wirth, 1951
 Deuterophlebia tyosenensis Kitakami, 1938
 Deuterophlebia vernalis Courtney, 1990

References

Further reading

External links
 Photograph of larva
 Tree of Life Blephariceromorpha

Nematocera genera
Blephariceromorpha
Taxa named by Frederick Wallace Edwards